Peter James McDermott (April 6, 1910 – June 2, 2009) was an American basketball and baseball coach and college athletics administrator.  He served as the head basketball coach at Iona College in New Rochelle, New York from 1947 to 1973, compiling a record of 320–252.  McDermott was also the head baseball coach at Iona from 1947 to 1963 and the school's athletic director from 1956 to 1976.  He was the first commissioner of the Metro Atlantic Athletic Conference (MAAC).

References

External links
 

1910 births
2009 deaths
Iona Gaels athletic directors
Iona Gaels baseball coaches
Iona Gaels men's basketball coaches
Metro Atlantic Athletic Conference commissioners